One of Many is a 1917 American film written and directed by Christy Cabanne, starring Frances Nelson with Niles Welch, Mary Mersch, Caroline Harris and Harold Entwistle.

References

1917 films
American black-and-white films
American silent feature films
Silent American drama films
1917 drama films
Metro Pictures films
1910s American films